Albolagh or Al Bolagh, also rendered as Al Bulaq, may refer to:
 Albolagh, Kurdistan
 Al Bolagh, Kurdistan
 Albolagh, Razavi Khorasan
 Albolagh, Bukan, West Azerbaijan Province
 Albolagh, Mahabad, West Azerbaijan Province